Isabel Baumann (born 19 August 1978) is a Swiss bobsledder who has competed since 2002. Her best finish in the Bobsleigh World Cup was seventh in the two-woman event at Altenberg in January .

Bauman's best finish at the FIBT World Championships was 12th in the two-woman event at St. Moritz in 2007.

External links
ISBF profile

1978 births
Living people
Swiss female bobsledders
Place of birth missing (living people)